Harold William "H.W." Coyle (born February 16, 1952) is an American writer and author of historical and speculative fiction and of war novels including Team Yankee, a New York Times bestseller. He graduated from the Virginia Military Institute in 1974, spent 14 years on active duty with the US Army, and is a veteran of the Persian Gulf War. Other pen names include H.W. Coyle. He has co-authored books with Barrett Tillman and Jennifer Ellis.

Bibliography

Novels

Stand-Alone Novels

Civil War Novels

French & Indian War Novel

Scott Dixon Novels

Nathan Dixon Novels

With Barrett Tillman

With Jennifer Ellis

References

External links
 Harold Coyle's books published by Tor Books
 Fantastic Fiction bibliography

Virginia Military Institute alumni
Living people
1952 births
American male novelists
20th-century American novelists
21st-century American novelists
20th-century American male writers
21st-century American male writers